This is a partial list of molecules that contain 22 carbon atoms.

See also
 Carbon number
 List of compounds with carbon number 21
 List of compounds with carbon number 23

C22